Sofiya "Sofi" Marinova Kamenova (is a Bulgarian Romani pop-folk and ethno-pop singer. She has won multiple music awards and contests. She is often called "the Romani pearl" and "the Romani nightingale". In February 2012, she won the Bulgarian Eurovision national final with the song "Love Unlimited", thus becoming the representative of Bulgaria in the 2012 Eurovision Song Contest in Baku, Azerbaijan.

Biography 
Sofi Marinova was born on December 5, 1975 in Sofia, Bulgaria, although her family was living near Etropole at the time. She showed musical and dancing talent at the age of two and was tutored in singing and dancing by her mother. In primary school, Marinova was an excellent pupil. She spent a year at a professional builders' school. After 8th grade she moved to a professional school for tailors, though years later she admitted she never liked sewing. While at school, Marinova fell for acting, appearing in school musicals such as Snow White. When she was in 10th grade, a local band offered her the position of lead singer. Her father didn't allow it at first but relented after the insistence of her mother: "I started crying and my mother supported me, because when she married my father she put an end to her singing career".

At age 17, Marinova began singing at weddings and christenings. Her repertoire included songs of Dragana Mirkovic, Michael Jackson, Sandra, Whitney Houston as well as Romani music. Around this time she and the band took part in a music competition in the village of Osikovitsa near Sofia. She won the singers event and the admirations of the jury, chaired by the famous Romani-Bulgarian musician Angelo Malikov. At the competition she also met Petar, a drummer, who later became the father of her only child, Lorenzo. After Osikovitsa, Marinova won the Grand prize at the Stara Zagora festival with her songs "Stari Rani" (Old wounds) and "Slanchitse moe" (My Little Sun).

Marinova was introduced to the big stage by Nencho Kasamov, president of the record company ARA Music, after he saw her performing in a restaurant. Kasamov invited her to record for ARA, because he sensed the future music star in her "by the look in her eyes." Marinova and her band recorded for ARA the album "Stari Rani", which is believed to be one of the best-selling music albums in Bulgaria of all time.

In 2004, Marinova signed with Sunny Music, working with the producer Krum Krumov. She recorded the albums 5 oktavi ljubov and Obicham. Her cooperation with the Bulgarian hip-hop singer Ustata resulted in some of her most successful songs. In that period she also recorded a Romani cover of "Vetrove" by Lili Ivanova, Bulgaria's most established music artist. The compilation "Sofi Marinova Best MP3 Collection" consisting of her 64 most popular songs from her Sunny Music period, was released in 2009. She stated that she was "happy that my project was accomplished and I hope my fans accept it as a gift for their loyalty and love for me for so many years."

On March 28, as part of the pre-celebrations for the International Romani Day, Sofi Marinova sang Romani songs and her Eurovision song "Love Unlimited" in front of MEPs and official guests in the building of the European Parliament in Brussels. She was invited there by the MEPs from Bulgaria.

Philanthropy and charity work 
In 2008, Marinova and Ustata joined a campaign against human trafficking, for which they recorded Chuzhdi ustni (A Stranger's Lips). Both of them travelled around Bulgaria and met with youths in the risk groups for becoming victims of human trafficking. In 2010 Marinova was appointed ambassador against poverty and social isolation. Her tasks include raising awareness about the issues, taking part in various activities and sharing her own experience. On her appointment she told the journalists: "I think I can be useful to the campaign. In addition I myself come from a poor family and I'm aware of the concerns of poor and underprivileged people."

Personal life 
Marinova has one son, Lorenzo, with whom she has done some collaboration single with. She was married once (to Lorenzo's father Peter). She then had a long-term relationship with Dacho, who is Peter's eldest son. They tried to marry two times, but they didn't and finally broke up in 2010. She is well known for her honest and direct answers to media's questions in interviews.

Eurovision Song Contest
Sofi Marinova was chosen to represent Bulgaria in the Eurovision Song Contest in Baku in May 2012 with the song "Love Unlimited". She won the National final, which was held on February 29, receiving a total of 20 points - the maximum 12 points from the public and 8 points from the jury. She was one of the favourites to win after coming second in the public vote in the semifinals. The song "Love Unlimited" was written by Yassen Kotsev and Krum Georgiev. Its lyrics talk about the transcending and all-embracing power of love ("The song has no borders, language and colour").) The song is in Bulgarian but contains the phrase "I love you" in Turkish, Greek, Spanish, Serbo-Croat, French, Romani, English, Azerbaijani and Italian. The song is characterised by the typical Romani glides, vocal power and Techno musical arrangement. Marinova performed in the first half of the second semifinal on May 24 and narrowly missed out on qualifying for the grand final, finishing 11th place and scoring the same number of points as Norway who got through in 10th place.

This was Marinova's third appearance in the Bulgarian national finals for Eurovision. In 2005, her collaboration with Slavi Trifonov "Edinstveni" ("Only Ones") finished second. They tried again the following year with the song "Ljubovta e otrova" ("Love Is a Poison"), but fell out in the qualifications after taking 25th place, one place short of the semi-final. In 2007, her collaboration with Ustata, "Ya Tvoya" ("I'm yours" in Russian), finished third in the National final.

Discography 

Solo albums

Albums with the band Super Express

.* — Romani language albums

Compilations

The MP3 album Golden Hits contains all the songs from Sofi Marinova's first five solo albums plus some songs from her albums with Super Express and a few other songs.

References

External links

1975 births
Living people
21st-century Bulgarian women singers
Bulgarian folk-pop singers
Eurovision Song Contest entrants for Bulgaria
Eurovision Song Contest entrants of 2012
Musicians from Sofia
Bulgarian people of Romani descent
Romani singers
Bulgarian pop musicians
20th-century Bulgarian women singers